Collin Walke (born October 19, 1982) is an American politician who served in the Oklahoma House of Representatives from the 87th district from 2016 to 2022.
He announced he would retire from office at the end of the 2022 term.
He is Cherokee.

References

1982 births
Living people
People from Del City, Oklahoma
Cherokee Nation state legislators in Oklahoma
Democratic Party members of the Oklahoma House of Representatives
21st-century American politicians
21st-century Native American politicians